Josep Maria Bartomeu Floreta (born 6 February 1963) is a Spanish entrepreneur, and a former president of football club FC Barcelona. He started his presidency in 2014, following the resignation of Sandro Rosell; he held the post until his resignation in 2020. He was replaced by interim FC Barcelona president Carlos Tusquets, and afterwards by election winner Joan Laporta.

Career 
Partner and CEO of the companies ADELTE and EFS, Bartomeu served on the board of FC Barcelona during Joan Laporta's presidency (as head of the basketball section) along with Sandro Rosell, who resigned due to differences with the then president. He then served as Rosell's vice-president of Barcelona from July 2010 to January 2014 after they won the election with 61.35% of the vote of the members of the club. Following the resignation of Sandro Rosell on 23 January 2014, due to the so-called "Neymar case", Bartomeu was, following the club's constitution, elected, as the fortieth President of Barcelona, to complete Rosell's term.

On 27 October 2020, Bartomeu announced his resignation, along with the entire Board of Directors.

Tax fraud allegations 

Bartomeu was investigated in a case of alleged tax fraud over the signing of striker Neymar, along with former president Sandro Rosell. He was set to stand trial after his appeal was rejected. After a further appeal, it was reported that Bartomeu would not stand trial over the allegations; Rosell and FC Barcelona were similarly cleared. The thorough research at the Camp Nou offices on Monday morning, carried out by the Mossos d'Esquadra (Catalonia police force), led to the arrest of Bartomeu, alongside the Chief Executive Officer of the club, Oscar Grau, former adviser to the presidency Jaume Masferrer, and head of legal counsel Roman Gomez Ponti.

Controversy
In March 2021, he was investigated by Catalan police, due to an alleged defamation campaign against FC Barcelona, known as Barçagate. Bartomeu was accused of hiring I3 Ventures to improve the club's image on social media and was accused of launching a smear campaign against some of the club's star players.

Trophies won by club during presidency

Football

FC Barcelona:

La Liga:
2014–15, 2015–16, 2017–18, 2018–19
Copa del Rey:
2014–15, 2015–16, 2016–17, 2017–18
Supercopa de España: 
2016, 2018
 UEFA Champions League:
2014–15
 UEFA Super Cup:
2015
 FIFA Club World Cup:
2015

FC Barcelona Femení:

Primera División (women):
2013–14, 2014–15, 2019–20
Copa de la Reina de Fútbol:
2014, 2017

Futsal

FC Barcelona Futsal:

Primera División:
2018–19
Copa del Rey de Futsal:
2013–14
UEFA Futsal Cup:
2013–14
Copa de España (LNFS):
2019

Beach soccer

FC Barcelona Beach Soccer:

Mundialito de Clubes:
2015

Basketball

FC Barcelona Basketball:

Liga ACB:
2013–14
Copa del Rey de Baloncesto:
2018, 2019
Supercopa de España de Baloncesto:
2015

Handball

FC Barcelona Handbol:

IHF Super Globe:
2014, 2017, 2018
EHF Champions League:
2014–15
Liga ASOBAL:
2013–14, 2014–15, 2015–16, 2016–17, 2017–18, 2018–19
Copa del Rey de Balonmano:
2014–15, 2015–16, 2016–17, 2017–18, 2018–19
Copa ASOBAL:
2014–15, 2015–16, 2016–17, 2017–18, 2018–19
Supercopa ASOBAL:
2014–15, 2015–16, 2016–17, 2017–2018, 2018–19

Roller hockey

FC Barcelona Roller Hockey:
OK Liga:
2013–14, 2014–15, 2015–16, 2016–17, 2017–18, 2018–19
Copa del Rey de Hockey Patines:
2016, 2017, 2018, 2019
Supercopa de España de Hockey Patines:
2014, 2015, 2017
CERH European League:
2013–14, 2014–15, 2017–18
CERH Continental Cup:
2015, 2018 
Roller Hockey Intercontinental Cup:
2014

Ice hockey

FC Barcelona Ice Hockey:

Spanish ice hockey cups:
2014–15
2018–19

References

External links

Profile at FC Barcelona's official website

1963 births
Living people
People from Barcelona
FC Barcelona presidents